Quincy Butler may refer to:

 Quincy Butler (American football) (born 1981)
 Quincy Butler (soccer) (born 2001)